New Zealand competed at the 1992 Summer Olympics in Barcelona, Spain. The New Zealand Olympic Committee was represented by 134 athletes and 70 officials. 134 competitors, 92 men and 42 women, took part in 87 events in 17 sports. Ralph Roberts was the team's Chef de Mission.

Medalists

Competitors
The following is the list of number of competitors in the Games.

Archery

New Zealand sent one archer to Barcelona. She did not advance to the elimination rounds.

Athletics

Track and road

Field

Combined

Badminton

Boxing

Canoeing

Slalom

Sprint

Cycling

Fourteen cyclists, eleven men and three women, represented New Zealand in 1992. Gary Anderson won a bronze medal in the individual pursuit.

Road

Track

Men's 1 km time trial

Men's points race

Men's sprint

Pursuit

Diving

Equestrian

Eventing

Jumping

Individual

Team

Fencing

One male fencer represented New Zealand in 1992.

Men's individual épée

Field hockey

Men's team competition
Preliminary round (Pool B)
New Zealand – Spain 0–3
New Zealand – Pakistan 0–1
New Zealand – The Netherlands 3–4
New Zealand – Malaysia 2–3
New Zealand – Unified Team 2–1 
 Classification matches
 5th–8th place: New Zealand – Great Britain 2–3
 7th–8th place: New Zealand – India 2–3 → 8th place

 Team roster
 ( 1.) Peter Daji (captain)
 ( 2.) Brett Leaver
 ( 3.) David Grundy
 ( 4.) Scott Hobson
 ( 5.) Grant McLeod
 ( 6.) Peter Miskimmin
 ( 7.) Paresh Patel
 ( 8.) David Penfold
 ( 9.) John Radovonich
 (10.) Craig Russ
 (11.) Greg Russ
 (12.) Umesh Parag
 (13.) Jamie Smith
 (14.) Anthony Thornton
 (15.) Scott Anderson (gk)
 (16.) Ian Woodley (gk)

Women's team competition
 Preliminary round (Pool B)
 New Zealand – South Korea 0–6
 New Zealand – The Netherlands 0–2
 New Zealand – Great Britain 2–3
 Classification matches
 5th–8th place: New Zealand – Australia 1–5
 7th–8th place: New Zealand – Canada 0–2 → 8th place

 Team roster
 ( 1.) Elaine Jensen (gk)
 ( 2.) Helen Shearer (gk)
 ( 3.) Mary Clinton (captain)
 ( 4.) Tina Bell-Kake
 ( 5.) Christine Arthur
 ( 6.) Shane Collins
 ( 7.) Sapphire Cooper
 ( 8.) Kylie Foy
 ( 9.) Sue Duggan
 (10.) Susan Furmage
 (11.) Trudy Kilkolly
 (12.) Anna Lawrence
 (13.) Kieren O'Grady
 (14.) Mandy Smith
 (15.) Robyn Toomey
 (16.) Kate Trolove

Judo

Rowing

New Zealand qualified four boats for the 1992 Summer Olympics: men's single sculls, men's coxless four, men's coxed four, and women's double sculls.

Men

Women

Sailing

New Zealand had 17 competitors in Barcelona; 13 men and 4 women.

Shooting

Swimming

Table tennis

Wrestling

References

Nations at the 1992 Summer Olympics
1992
Summer Olympics